"Ms. Fat Booty" is a song by American rapper Mos Def. It was released on August 2, 1999 through Rawkus Records, as the lead single from the musician's debut solo studio album Black on Both Sides. Production was handled by Ayatollah, who used multiple samples of Aretha Franklin's 1965 single "One Step Ahead".

The song peaked at number 84 on the Dutch Single Top 100 and number 85 on the UK Singles Chart. Later in 2010 it was place at #144 on Pitchfork's "The Top 200 Tracks of the 1990s" list.

It also appears on MTV Classic's 90's Nation and Yo! Hip Hop Mix.

The song's sequel, "Ms. Fat Booty 2" featuring Ghostface Killah, was featured in 2000 compilation album Lyricist Lounge 2.

Track listing

Charts

References

External links

1999 songs
1999 singles
Mos Def songs
Rawkus Records singles
Songs written by Mos Def